Thomas Babington Macaulay (1800–1859) was a British historian and politician.

Thomas or Tom Macaulay may also refer to:

Thomas Bassett Macaulay (1860–1942), Canadian actuary and philanthropist
Tom Macaulay (1906–1979), British actor
Thomas Babington Macaulay (Nigeria) (1826–1878), educationist, reverend, and father of Nigerian nationalist Herbert Macaulay

See also
Thomas McAulay (disambiguation)
Tom McCauley (died 1865), California Gold Rush criminal
Tom McCauley (American football) (born 1947), American football defensive back